Galgut is a surname. Notable people with the surname include:

Brian Galgut (born 1937), South African lawyer and judge
Damon Galgut (born 1963), South African playwright and novelist
Oscar Galgut (1906–1999), South African lawyer and Judge of Appeal in the Supreme Court of Appeal